Dan Daniel (born Wilbur Clarence Daniel; May 12, 1914 – January 23, 1988) was a Member of the U.S. House of Representatives from Virginia, serving from 1969 until his death from a heart attack in Charlottesville in 1988. He previously served as the National Commander of The American Legion from 1956 to 1957.

Life 
Born in Chatham, Virginia, Dan Daniel grew up on a tobacco farm in Mecklenburg County. He was educated in Virginia schools, and was a graduate of Dan River Textile School, Danville, Virginia. Danville, on the Dan River, was at the time a center for the tobacco and textile industries. The name of the school references the textile industry, and the town is known for the Dan River textile mill, which was founded in 1883 and closed in 2006. From 1939 to 1968, except for a period of service in the U.S. Navy during World War II era, he was associated with Dan River Mills (present day Dan River, Inc.), the textile industry that operated a mill on the Dan River. He advanced through the ranks of the textile business to become assistant to the chairman of the board at Dan River Mills. He was elected commander of The American Legion's Department of Virginia in 1951, and National Commander in 1956. He was elected to the Virginia House of Delegates from 1959 to 1968, was President of the Virginia Chamber of Commerce in 1968, and was a permanent member of the President's People-to-People Committee (now People to People International). He was elected as a Democrat to the 91st United States Congress and to nine succeeding congresses, serving from January 3, 1969, until his death from a heart attack at the University of Virginia Medical Center in Charlottesville, on January 23, 1988. He was interred in Highland Burial Park in Danville, Virginia.

Electoral history 
1968; Daniel was elected to the U.S. House of Representatives with 54.59% of the vote, defeating Republican Weldon W. Tuck and Independent Ruth L. Harvey.
1970; Daniel was re-elected with 73.03% of the vote, defeating Republican Allen T. St. Clair.
1972; Daniel was re-elected unopposed.
1974; Daniel was re-elected unopposed.
1976; Daniel was re-elected unopposed.
1978; Daniel was re-elected unopposed.
1980; Daniel was re-elected unopposed.
1982; Daniel was re-elected unopposed.
1984; Daniel was re-elected unopposed.
1986; Daniel was re-elected with 81.54% of the vote, defeating Independent J.F. Cole.

See also 

List of foreign recipients of the National Order of Merit
List of people from Virginia
List of United States representatives from Virginia
List of United States Congress members who died in office (1950–99)

References

Further reading

External links 

Dan Daniel at Encyclopedia Virginia

Dan Daniel at The Political Graveyard

 

1914 births
1988 deaths
20th-century American businesspeople
20th-century American politicians
American textile industry businesspeople
Burials in Virginia
Businesspeople from Virginia
Knights of the Ordre national du Mérite
Deaths from aortic dissection
Democratic Party members of the Virginia House of Delegates
Military personnel from Virginia
Democratic Party members of the United States House of Representatives from Virginia
National Commanders of the American Legion
People from Chatham, Virginia
United States Navy sailors